Muhammad Ahmed  (born 14 December 1991) is a Pakistani footballer playing currently for KRL FC.

Ahmed is a defender and made his international debut against Malaysia in 2008.

References

Living people
Pakistani footballers
Pakistan international footballers
1991 births
Association football defenders
People from Lahore